Lamayn Wilson (born June 11, 1980) is an American professional basketball player who last played for ADA Blois Basket 41 of the LNB Pro B.

Playing career
After finishing collegiate career at the Troy State, Lamayn started his pro career in Latvia with BK Skonto. It turned into efficient career as he later also played for teams in Russia, Germany, France, Italy, Ukraine, China, Turkey, Philippines, Puerto Rico, Georgia.

During the 2007–08 season, he Wilson played for ASVEL Basket, where he averaged 17.1 points and 5.8 rebounds in ULEB Cup, helping the team to reach the elimination rounds. With ASVEL he also won French Cup. In the following season Wilson played in Euroleague for SLUC Nancy Basket.

In 2010-11 season, he played key role in BC Budivelnyk success, which resulted in making quarterfinals of Eurocup and winning Ukrainian championship. For the 2011-12 season Lamayn signed with Czech Republic's ČEZ Basketball Nymburk, helping them to reach Eurocup playoffs and win domestic league title.

On August 24, 2014, he signed with Ironi Nes Ziona B.C. from Israel.

EuroLeague career statistics

|-
| align="left" | 2008-09
| align="left" | SLUC Nancy
| 9 || 9 || 30.1 || .448 || .317|| .556|| 4.1 || .8 || 1.4 || .3 || 12.1 || 9.3
|- class="sortbottom"
| colspan=2 style="text-align:center;" | Career
| 9 || 9 || 30.1 || .448 || .317|| .556|| 4.1 || .8 || 1.4 || .3 || 12.1 || 9.3

References

External links
 DraftExpress.com profile
 Euroleague Profile
 FIBA Europe Profile

1980 births
Living people
ADA Blois Basket 41 players
African-American basketball players
American expatriate basketball people in the Czech Republic
American expatriate basketball people in Finland
American expatriate basketball people in France
American expatriate basketball people in Georgia (country)
American expatriate basketball people in Germany
American expatriate basketball people in Italy
American expatriate basketball people in Latvia
American expatriate basketball people in Turkey
American expatriate basketball people in Ukraine
American men's basketball players
ASVEL Basket players
Basketball players from Alabama
BC Avtodor Saratov players
BC Budivelnyk players
BC Krasnye Krylia players
Capitanes de Arecibo players
Basketball Nymburk players
Cholet Basket players
Ironi Nes Ziona B.C. players
Junior college men's basketball players in the United States
Kataja BC players
Riesen Ludwigsburg players
Pallacanestro Cantù players
SLUC Nancy Basket players
Troy Trojans men's basketball players
Türk Telekom B.K. players
Forwards (basketball)
21st-century African-American sportspeople
20th-century African-American people